Dorje were an English rock band formed in 2012 under the name The Rob Chapman Band, however soon changed their name to Dorje. It was founded by Rob Chapman, Rabea Massaad, Dave Hollingworth and Ben Minal.

Description

2007–2012: Formative years, Primordial Audio Chronicle 
Prior to Dorje, Massaad, Hollingworth and Minal were members of nu metal band ChasinJade. After a chance meeting in a bar, Chapman asked Massaad to join the band he was forming. Subsequently Hollingworth and Minal were brought on board, forming The Rob Chapman Band. The band eventually began to focus less on Chapman's solo compositions, and a new name was chosen: Dorje. Their debut EP, Primordial Audio Chronicle: Volume One, was released on 14 October 2012, and their first UK tour sold out.

2012–2016 
Dorje released their first single, "White Dove", from the EP Catalyst, on 6 August 2015, which was followed by their EP Catalyst on 6 November 2015. This was supported by the Catalyst tour of the United Kingdom.

On 14 October 2016 Dorje released the Centred and One EP.

2016–2021 
Dorje have been on an unofficial hiatus whilst members have focused on other musical projects since mid-2016, it is currently unknown if they plan to return. In October 2020 the band released a statement that drummer Ben Minal had left Dorje. Rob Chapman has officially written a statement that Dorje has been disbanded as of 16/12/2021.

Discography

Singles

Members 

Rob Chapman – lead vocals, guitars (2012–2021)
Rabea Massaad – guitars, backing vocals (2012–2021)
Dave Hollingworth – bass (2012–2021)
Ben Minal – drums (2012–2020)

Musical style 
Dorje have been called progressive metal, progressive rock, alternative metal, blues rock and hard rock, additionally they have been compared to the likes of Audioslave, Tool and Alter Bridge.

References 

2012 establishments in England
English progressive metal musical groups
Musical groups established in 2012
Alternative metal musicians